Anhalt-Zerbst was a principality of the Holy Roman Empire ruled by the House of Ascania, with its residence at Zerbst in present-day Saxony-Anhalt. It emerged as a subdivision of the Principality of Anhalt from 1252 until 1396, when it was divided into the principalities of Anhalt-Dessau and Anhalt-Köthen. Recreated in 1544, Anhalt-Zerbst finally was partitioned between Anhalt-Dessau, Anhalt-Köthen, and Anhalt-Bernburg in 1796 upon the extinction of the line.

History
It was created when the Anhalt territory was divided among the sons of Prince Henry I into the principalities of Anhalt-Aschersleben, Anhalt-Bernburg and Anhalt-Zerbst in 1252. In the course of the partition, Prince Siegfried I, the youngest son of Henry I, received the lands around Köthen, Dessau, and Zerbst. His son and successor Prince Albert I took his residence at Köthen Castle in 1295. In 1396, the surviving sons of Prince John II of Anhalt-Zerbst again divided their heritage: Sigismund I became Prince of Anhalt-Dessau and his younger brother Albert IV went on to rule as Prince of Anhalt-Köthen.

The principality was recreated, when in 1544 the heirs of Prince Ernest I of Anhalt-Dessau divided their territory and the eldest surviving son, Prince John V, took his residence at Zerbst Castle. The second incarnation, however, lost a lot of territory in 1603 when it was partitioned for a second time with some of its territory being given to Anhalt-Dessau, Anhalt-Bernburg, Anhalt-Plötzkau and Anhalt-Köthen.

By 1606, all Anhalt principalities had turned to the Reformed faith, however, Anhalt-Zerbst returned to Lutheranism in 1644. In 1667, Prince John VI inherited the remote Lordship of Jever in East Frisia. Upon his death in the same year, however, Anhalt-Zerbst lost more of its territory, with Anhalt-Mühlingen and Anhalt-Dornburg being created. The Jever lordship was administrated by Ascanian relatives, it was hit hard by the Christmas Flood of 1717.

In 1742 princes John Louis II and Christian August of Anhalt-Zerbst-Dornburg inherited Anhalt-Zerbst. After Christian August's death in 1747, his widow Johanna Elisabeth of Holstein-Gottorp governed the country for her son Frederick Augustus until 1752. She had the new castle at Dornburg built as her thirds from 1750, a lavish baroque palace prepared to host her brother, Adolf Frederick, King of Sweden, or her daughter Sophie Auguste Fredericka, who in 1745 had married the Russian crown prince Peter III, to become empress in 1762, better known as Catherine the Great. However, neither of them ever visited her, and the dowager princess and her son were forced into exile when Prussian forces invaded Anhalt-Zerbst during the Seven Years' War in 1758. Frederick the Great, who had actually proposed the Russian marriage, accused the princess and her son to support Russia, then his war enemy. Johanna Elisabeth died in Paris in 1760 and her son, Frederick Augustus, never returned to Zerbst and continued to live in Basel and Luxemburg. Upon his death in 1793, the Principality of Anhalt-Zerbst came to an end with its territory being divided among the Ascanian princes of Anhalt-Dessau, Anhalt-Köthen, and Anhalt-Bernburg while Jever was inherited by his sister, Catherine the Great, and remained under Russian rule until 1818.

Princes of Anhalt-Zerbst

Princes, 1252–1396
Siegfried I 1252–1298
Albert I 1298–1316
Albert II 1316–1362
Albert III 1359 (co-regent)
Waldemar I 1316–1368 (co-regent)
Johann II 1362–1382
Waldemar II 1368–1371 (co-regent)
Waldemar III 1382–1391 (co-regent)
Sigismund I 1382–1396 (co-regent)
Albert IV 1382–1396 (co-regent)
Partitioned between Anhalt-Dessau and Anhalt-Köthen in 1396.

Princes, 1544–1796
Johann V 1544–1551
Karl I 1551–1561
Bernhard VII 1551–1570 (co-regent)
Joachim Ernest 1551–1586 (co-regent, later sole ruler; he unified all the Anhalt lands); later, his sons divided again Anhalt.
Rudolph 1603–1621
Johann VI 1621–1667
Augustus of Anhalt-Plötzkau regent 1621–1642
Karl William 1667–1718
Sophie Auguste of Schleswig-Holstein-Gottorp regent 1667–1674
Johann August 1718–1742
Johann Ludwig II 1742–1746
Christian Augustus 1742–1747 (co-regent)
Friedrich August 1747–1793
Joanna Elisabeth of Holstein-Gottorp regent 1747–1752
Sophie Auguste Fredericke (Empress Catherine II of Russia) 1793–1796 (only in Jever)
To Anhalt-Dessau 1796.

See also
 Anhalt-Zerbst

References
Regnal chronology

House of Ascania
 
Lists of princes
History of Anhalt
Principalities of the Holy Roman Empire
Upper Saxon Circle
1250s establishments in the Holy Roman Empire
1252 establishments in Europe
1390s disestablishments in the Holy Roman Empire
1396 disestablishments in Europe
States and territories established in 1252
States and territories disestablished in 1396
States and territories established in 1544
States and territories disestablished in 1796
1544 establishments in the Holy Roman Empire
1796 disestablishments in the Holy Roman Empire
Former states and territories of Saxony-Anhalt